is a Buddhist temple in the town of Tawaramoto, Nara Prefecture, Japan. It is located in Tawaramoto near Kasanui Station. It was commissioned by Prince Shotoku in the 5th century and built by Hata no Kawakatsu. The Great Hall contains a Bodhisattva while outside there is also a Shinto shrine with a torii and a pond in the shape of a Chinese character.

See also 
 For an explanation of terms concerning Japanese Buddhism, Japanese Buddhist art, and Japanese Buddhist temple architecture, see the Glossary of Japanese Buddhism.

References

Jinraku-ji
Shingon Ritsu temples
Prince Shōtoku
Tawaramoto, Nara